Yesterday's Dreams is the seventh overall and sixth studio album recorded by the Four Tops, issued by Motown Records in August 1968. The album was recorded as the main Motown songwriting/producing partnership of Holland–Dozier–Holland were leaving the label, and as a result only contains one song from them, "I'm in a Different World", which was released as a single.

There are several other original Motown songs on the album, including the title track, "Remember When", "We've Got a Strong Love (On Our Side)", "Can't Seem to Get You out of My Mind" and a cover of Stevie Wonder's "A Place in the Sun". The rest are cover songs produced by Ivy Jo Hunter and Frank Wilson.

Track listing

Personnel
Levi Stubbs – lead vocals
Lawrence Payton – backing vocals, keyboards
Renaldo "Obie" Benson – backing vocals
Abdul "Duke" Fakir – backing vocals
The Andantes - additional background vocals (tracks 2–5, 7–11)
The Originals - additional background vocals (tracks 2 and 11)
 Instrumentation by The Funk Brothers

References

External links

Four Tops albums
1968 albums
Albums produced by Frank Wilson (musician)
Albums produced by Ashford & Simpson
Albums produced by Ivy Jo Hunter
Motown albums
Albums recorded at Hitsville U.S.A.